Charles Phelps Norton (March 15, 1858 – July 11, 1923) was chancellor of the University of Buffalo from 1909–20; and a founder of the University of Buffalo Law School, now known as the State University of New York at Buffalo

Biography
Norton was born in Buffalo, N.Y. in 1858 and was the son of Charles Davis Norton and Jeannette Phelps; whose grandmother Elizabeth "Betsy" Law ( Sherman) Phelps was the granddaughter of American founding father Roger Sherman. His brother, Porter Norton, wa a lawyer who married Jennie H. Watson (daughter of Stephen Van Rensselaer Watson).

He went to Harvard University, where he was a classmate and friend of former President Theodore Roosevelt, in the class of 1880.  Norton studied law and was admitted to the bar in 1885.

Death and legacy
Norton died July 11, 1923 at Johns Hopkins Hospital in Baltimore, Maryland. He left his entire estate to the university, on the condition that within three years of the probate of the will, all principal and interest would be applied to the erection of a building known as Norton Hall to be used as a meeting place for student activities.  He also endowed the Norton Medal, University at Buffalo's highest honor.

References

1858 births
1923 deaths
American academic administrators
American founders
Harvard University alumni